Anjavarud (also Romanized as Anjāvarūd and Anjāverūd; also known as Anjarū and Anjauru) is a village in Direh Rural District, in the Central District of Gilan-e Gharb County, Kermanshah Province, Iran. At the 2006 census, its population was 287, in 58 families.

References 

Populated places in Gilan-e Gharb County